John Mitchell (born 21 June 1973) is an Irish musician and record producer. He primarily plays guitar and has been a member of the bands It Bites, Arena, Frost*, Kino, A, The Urbane and Lonely Robot.

Early life and career

Mitchell describes seeing Eric Clapton perform the song "Miss You" from his 1986 album August at a Prince's Trust concert as "the single defining moment that made me decide to put down the violin and pick up a guitar".

Influenced by guitarists such as Jeff Beck, Trevor Rabin and David Gilmour, Mitchell mainly sings and plays guitar, but is also a multi-instrumentalist. He is best known as the current frontman for British prog-pop band It Bites (having replaced original singer and guitarist Francis Dunnery in 2006). Mitchell has also played guitar for a number of other progressive rock bands including Arena, The Urbane, Kino, Frost*, and the John Wetton band. In 2008, Mitchell was drafted in to join A, playing bass in place of original bass player Daniel P. Carter to support The Wildhearts on their December UK tour, as well as a 10-date headline tour in 2009. In 2012, Mitchell toured with Martin Barre in his band "New Day", singing lead vocals on many songs by Jethro Tull.

Mitchell is also a record producer and sound engineer at Outhouse Studios, a recording studio in Reading, UK, where he has recorded and produced music for a number of rock bands including Enter Shikari, You Me at Six, Lower Than Atlantis, Architects, The Blackout, Kids in Glass Houses, Funeral for a Friend, My Passion, Exit Ten, I Divide, Ivyrise, Anavae, Touchstone, Your Demise and You and What Army.

Mitchell's latest music project is a solo project called Lonely Robot, whose album Please Come Home was released on 23 February 2015. It features a number of guest artists including Peter Cox, Steve Hogarth, Jem Godfrey, Nik Kershaw, and British actor Lee Ingleby. The albums The Big Dream released in April 2017 and Under Stars (April 2019), followed.

Mitchell is also the co-owner and co-founder of White Star Records, an independent record label which focuses on prog rock artists. Mitchell released his EP, The Nostalgia Factory, on White Star Records in 2016.

Discography

with The Urbane
 Neon (1999)
 Glitter (2003)

with Arena
 The Cry (1997 - EP)
 Welcome to the Stage (1997 - live)
 The Visitor (1998)
 Immortal? (2000)
 Breakfast in Biarritz (2001 - live)
 Contagion (2003)
 Contagious (2003 - EP)
 Contagium''' (2003 - EP)
 Live & Life (2004 - live)
 Pepper's Ghost (2005)
 Ten Years On (2006 - compilation)
 The Seventh Degree Of Separation (2011)
 Contagion Max (2014)
 The Unquiet Sky (2015)
 Double Vision (2018)

with Kino
 Picture (2005)
 Cutting Room Floor (2005 - compilation)
 Radio Voltaire (2018)

with Frost*
 Milliontown (2006)
 Experiments in Mass Appeal (2008)
 FrostFest Live CD (2009)
 The Philadelphia Experiment (2010 - live)
 The Rockfield Files (2013 - DVD)
 Falling Satellites (2016)
 Day and Age (2021)

with Blind Ego
 Mirror (2007)

with John Wetton
 Amorata (2009) (METAL MIN2)

with It Bites
 When The Lights Go Down (2007 - live)
 The Tall Ships (2008)
 This Is Japan (2010 - live)
 It Happened One Night (2011 - live)
 Map of the Past (2012)

with Gandalf's Fist
 A Forest of Fey (2014)

with Lonely Robot
 Please Come Home (2015)
 The Big Dream (2017)
 Under Stars (2019)
 Feelings Are Good (2020)
 A Model Life (2022)

with Legacy Pilots
 Con Brio (2018)
 Aviation (2020)
 The Penrose Triangle (2021)

with The Kite Experiment
 Atmospherics (2021 - EP)

Solo
 The Nostalgia Factory '' (2016 - EP)

Equipment
Mitchell primarily uses Cort Guitars – white and black G254s on stage, and for recording, a tobacco G210 and a blue/black G290. He also plays an Alvarez Yairi acoustic guitar in the studio, and a PRS Classic. Mitchell's rack set-up consists of a Marshall JMP1 Preamp with effects being produced by a vintage Korg A3 effects unit. This signal is then amplified by a Marshall Valvestate 80/80 power amp to a 4x12 Marshall cab.

References

External links 

 Official Facebook page
 Outhouse Studios website

1973 births
21st-century guitarists
Arena (band) members
Frost* members
It Bites members
Kino (British band) members
Living people
Progressive rock guitarists
Inside Out Music artists